Marcos Lueders Severo (born 13 March 1965) is a retired Brazilian football striker.

References

1965 births
Living people
Brazilian footballers
Avaí FC players
Grêmio Foot-Ball Porto Alegrense players
Londrina Esporte Clube players
Ulsan Hyundai FC players
Ponta Grossa Esporte Clube players
S.C. Salgueiros players
Varzim S.C. players
Rio Branco Football Club players
Association football forwards
Primeira Liga players
Brazilian expatriate footballers
Expatriate footballers in South Korea
Brazilian expatriate sportspeople in South Korea
Expatriate footballers in Portugal
Brazilian expatriate sportspeople in Portugal